This is a recap of the 1965 season for the Professional Bowlers Association (PBA) Tour.  It was the tour's seventh season, and consisted of 32 events. Dave Davis won the first two titles of his career, including the sixth PBA National Championship, but it was PBA legend Dick Weber who was honored with the Sporting News PBA Player of the Year award. The second-ever PBA Firestone Tournament of Champions was held this season, and featured all PBA titlists since the inaugural 1962 event.  The tournament offered a then-PBA record $25,000 first prize, and was won by Billy Hardwick. Following this season, the PBA announced that the Tournament of Champions would be an annual event.

Buzz Fazio won the season-opening tournament on December 14, 1964 for his second PBA title.  His victory made him the oldest player (56 years, 307 days) to capture a standard PBA Tour title—a record that would not be broken until 1995 (by 57-year-old John Handegard).

Tournament schedule

References

External links
1965 Season Schedule

Professional Bowlers Association seasons
1965 in bowling